The Uí Garrchon were the principal sub-sept of the Dál Messin Corb, who were the ruling dynasty of Leinster, Ireland for much of the fifth century. Their main opponents outside of Leinster were the nascent Uí Néill. Their known kings include:

 Driccriu
 Cilline mac Rónain
 Marcán mac Cilline
 Fincath mac Garrchu, died 485
 Fráech mac Finchada, died 495

See also

 Uí Enechglaiss

References
 Byrne, Francis John, Irish Kings and High-Kings Batsford, London, 1973. 
 Ireland, 400-800, pp. 188, by Dáibhí Ó Cróinín A New History of Ireland, Vol.I,  (edited Ó Cróinín).
 Carbury, Co. Kildare - topographical and onomastic hypotheses, Caitriona Devane, in Above and beyond:Essays in memory of Leo Swan, pp. 187–122, edited by Tom Condit and Christiaan Corlett, Wordwell, 2005. .

External links
CELT: Corpus of Electronic Texts at University College Cork includes: Gein Branduib (original & translation), Annals of Ulster, Annals of Tigernach, Annals of Innisfallen and others.

Gaelic-Irish nations and dynasties
5th-century Irish monarchs
Dál Messin Corb
Kings of Leinster